Daksh (Dexterous) is an electrically powered and remotely controlled robot used for locating, handling and destroying hazardous objects safely.

Description 

Daksh is a battery-operated remote-controlled robot on wheels that was created with a primary function of bomb recovery. Developed by Defence Research and Development Organisation, it is fully automated. It can navigate staircases, negotiate steep slopes, navigate narrow corridors and tow vehicles to reach hazardous materials. Using its robotized arm, it can lift a suspect object and scan it using its portable X-Ray device. If the object is a bomb, Daksh can defuse it with its water jet disrupter. It has a shotgun, which can break open locked doors, and it can scan cars for explosives. With a master control station (MCS), it can be remotely controlled over a range of 500 m in line of sight or within buildings. Ninety per cent of the robot’s components are indigenous. The Army has also placed limited series production orders for 20 Dakshs. The first batch of five units was handed over to General Combat Engineers, on 19 December 2011. The technology has been transferred for production to three firms, Dynalog, Theta Controls, and Bharat Electronics Ltd.so it is very important and useful robot for army or navy.

Total Containment Vessels 

 Fully automated
 Can neutralise NBC weapons
 Has radio frequency shield to jam remote signals for triggering a blast.

Operator
Indian Army

See also
Unmanned ground vehicle
MarkV-A1

References

External links
DRDO's Daksh demo-1 Youtube.com

Bomb disposal robots
Military equipment of India
Defence Research and Development Organisation
Robots of India
2000s robots
Six-wheeled robots
Military vehicles introduced in the 2010s